Ferdinando Albertolli (11 November 1780 – 24 April 1844) was a Swiss-born Italian architect and a professor of design.

Biography
Born in Bedano near Lugano, Switzerland, Albertolli was educated at Milan's Brera Academy where he was instructed by his uncle Giocondo Albertolli in engraving, design and architecture, receiving the first prize for design in 1806. In 1804, he taught at the high school in Verona until 1808 when he became professor of design at the Academy of Fine Arts in Venice. In 1812, he was appointed professor of design at the Brera Academy, a post he held for the remainder of his life.

Albertolli's Palazzo Taverna in the Del Monte district of Milan was completed in 1835 in the late Neoclassical style. It is notable in that it is reminiscent of Milan's Royal Villa and of country houses in general as the main body of the building is set back to form a courtyard overlooking the street. The entrance consists of an Ionic colonnade supporting a parapet. The two lateral sections have giant pilasters surmounted by triangular tympani.

See also

References

Bibliography
Pierpaolo Brugnoli; Arturo Sandrini, L'architettura a Verona dal periodo napoleonico all'età contemporanea, Banca Popolare di Verona, 1994. 

Architects from Ticino
Architects from Milan
19th-century Italian architects
1781 births
1844 deaths
Academic staff of Brera Academy